Everwild is an upcoming action-adventure video game developed by Rare and published by Xbox Game Studios for Windows and Xbox Series X/S.

Gameplay 

As Everwild is in development with few details announced, descriptions of its gameplay vary. In 2020, the game was described to be a third-person adventure game with elements taken from God games, and more recent reports suggest that the game is set to have no combat whatsoever.

Development 
Everwild began experimental prototyping.

Rare announced a new third-person action-adventure AAA game during the Xbox X019 presentation in 2019.

Gary Napper, who was previously the lead designer for Alien: Isolation, joined Rare as the design director for Everwild.

Video game journalist Jeff Grubb stated in a stream on June 12 2021 that Everwild had been rebooted since its initial development and was "a ways off", scheduled for approximately 2023. A Video Game Chronicles report on June 14 2021 corroborated that Everwild underwent a "complete reboot" after departure of creative director Simon Woodroffe, but stated that its planned release date had been pushed back to 2024 saying "Everwilds development team is now "optimistically" targeting a 2024 release".

References 

Upcoming video games
Action-adventure games
Rare (company) games
Video games developed in the United Kingdom
Video games scored by Robin Beanland
Windows games
Xbox Series X and Series S games